Yuriy Smotrich (born 5 June 1962) is a retired Ukrainian professional footballer.

Honours
 USSR Federation Cup winner: 1990.

1962 births
Living people
Soviet footballers
Soviet expatriate footballers
Ukrainian footballers
Ukrainian expatriate footballers
Expatriate footballers in the Czech Republic
Expatriate soccer players in the United States
Ukrainian Premier League players
FC Chornomorets Odesa players
FC Karpaty Lviv players
FC Zbrojovka Brno players
Rochester New York FC players
Association football defenders